Cimarron is a 1960 American Western film based on the Edna Ferber novel Cimarron. The film stars Glenn Ford and Maria Schell and was directed by Anthony Mann and Charles Walters, though Walters is not credited onscreen. Ferber's novel was previously adapted as a film in 1931; that version won three Academy Awards.

Cimarron was the first of three epics (along with El Cid and The Fall of the Roman Empire) that Mann directed. Despite high production costs and an experienced cast of western veterans, stage actors and future stars, the film was released with little fanfare.

Plot
Sabra Cravat joins her new husband, lawyer Yancey "Cimarron" Cravat, during the Oklahoma land rush of 1889. They encounter Yancey's old friend William "The Kid" Hardy and his buddies Wes Jennings and Hoss Barry. On the trail, Yancey helps Tom and Sarah Wyatt and their eight children, taking them aboard their wagons.

It seems to Sabra that her husband knows everyone in Oklahoma. A small crowd cheers Bob Yountis and his henchman Millis when they attack an Indian family. Yancey joins his friend Sam Pegler, editor of the Oklahoma Wigwam newspaper, in resisting Yountis.

Yountis warns Pegler against using the paper for his crusading as he had done in Texas. Sabra is angry that Yancey risked his life for an Indian but she helps the others, including peddler Sol Levy and printer Jesse Rickey, in righting the Indians' overturned wagon. Sam and his wife Mavis reveal more about Yancey's past as a cowboy, gambler, gunman and lawyer.

When 50,000 settlers race across the prairie to claim land, Tom falls and Sarah claims a dry, worthless patch. Pegler is trampled to death, and Dixie beats Yancey to the land that he wanted, so he asks Jesse to stay to help him run the paper.

In the new town of Osage, which consists of tents and half-built storefronts, Yountis and The Kid terrorize Levy in the street. Yancey tries but fails to persuade the Kid to change. One night, Yountis leads a lynch mob against the Indian family. Yancey arrives too late to stop it, but he kills Yountis and brings Arita and her baby Ruby home. Meanwhile, Sabra gives birth to a boy whom they name Cimarron, Cim for short.

Four years later, Osage is thriving. Tom has built an oil-drilling apparatus but he is a laughingstock. Wes, Hoss and The Kid, wanted outlaws, try to rob a train but are all killed soon after. When Yancey destroys the $1,000 reward check, Sabra is furious because he does not consider their son's security. Yancey leaves to be part of the Cherokee Strip, but Sabra refuses to join him. Years later, he returns and Sabra and Cim forgive him.

Tom finally strikes oil, but Yancey is disgusted to learn that Tom bought the rights to oil found on Indian land. However, Yancey's campaign to win the Indians justice is a huge success, and he is invited to become governor of the Oklahoma Territory. Sabra is disappointed to discover that Cim and Ruby have grown close.

In Washington, D.C., Yancey finds Tom with a group of influential men and learns that the price of his appointment is his integrity. When Yancy tells Sabra that he can't be governor, she sends him away forever.

Cim and Ruby marry without warning and set off for Oregon, though Sabra tells him that he is throwing his life away.

Ten years later, on the occasion of the Oklahoma Wigwam's 25th anniversary, war is declared. Later, Sabra hears that Yancey has been killed in the war.

Cast

Main
 Glenn Ford as Yancey Cravat
 Maria Schell as Sabra Cravat
 Anne Baxter as Dixie Lee
 Arthur O'Connell as Tom Wyatt
 Russ Tamblyn as William Hardy / The Cherokee Kid
 Mercedes McCambridge as Sarah Wyatt
 Vic Morrow as Wes Jennings
 Robert Keith as Sam Pegler
 Charles McGraw as Bob Yountis
 Aline MacMahon as Mavis Pegler
 Harry Morgan as Jesse Rickey (Credited as Henry "Harry" Morgan)
 David Opatoshu as Sol Levy
 Edgar Buchanan as Judge Neal Hefner

Supporting
 Lili Darvas as Felicia Venable
 Mary Wickes as Mrs. Neal Hefner
 Royal Dano as Ike Howes
 L. Q. Jones as Millis
 George Brenlin as Hoss Barry
 Vladimir Sokoloff as Jacob Krubeckoff
 Eugene Jackson as Isaiah

Cameo / Uncredited
 Andy Albin as Water Man
 Rayford Barnes as Cavalry Sergeant Who Breaks Up Fight
 Herman Belmonte as Dancer At Ball
 Mary Benoit as Mrs. Lancey
 Barry Bernard as Butler
 Jimmie Booth as Wagon Driver
 Danny Borzage as Townsman
 Chet Brandenburg as Townsman
 Janet Brandt as Madam Rhoda
 Paul Bryar as Mr. Self, Politician
 Robert Carson as Senator Rollins
 John L. Cason as Suggs
 William Challee as The Barber
 Mickie Chouteau as Ruby Red Feather
 Fred Coby as Oil Worker
 Gene Coogan as Butler / Townsman
 Jack Daly as Wyatt's Man
 John Damler as Foreman
 Richard Davies as Mr. Hodges
 George DeNormand as Townsman At Celebration
 James Dime as Townsman
 Phyllis Douglas as Sadie
 Ted Eccles as Cimarron Cravat – Age 2
 LaRue Farlow as Dancer
 Franklyn Farnum as Townsman At Schoolhouse
 George Ford as Townsman At Celebration
 Coleman Francis as Mr. Geer
 Ben Gary as Reporter
 James Halferty as Cimarron Cravat – Age 10
 Sam Harris as Ball Guest
 Lars Hensen as Dancer At Ball
 Clegg Hoyt as "Great" Gotch
 Irene James as Townswoman
 Colin Kenny as Townsman At Schoolhouse
 Paul Kruger as Party Guest
 Jimmy Lewis as Hefner Boy
 Dawn Little Sky as Arita Red Feather
 Eddie Little Sky as Ben Red Feather
 Buzz Martin as Cimarron Cravat as Young Man
 Kermit Maynard as Setter
 Mathew McCue as Townsman
 J. Edward McKinley as Beck
 Walter Merrill as Reporter
 Jack Perry as Townsman
 John Pickard as Ned, Cavalry Captain
 Ralph Reed as Bellboy
 William Remick as Reporter
 Gene Roth as Connors
 Jack Scroggy as Walter
 Charles Seel as Charles
 Bernard Sell as Townsman At Celebration
 Jack Stoney as Man At Lynching
 Harry Tenbrook as Sooner At Camp Fight
 Arthur Tovey as Dancer At Ball
 Ivan Triesault as Lewis Venable, Sabra's Father
 Charles Watts as Lou Brothers, Politician
 Helen Westcott as Miss Kuye, Schoolteacher
 Robert Williams as Oil Worker
 Jeane Wood as Clubwoman
 Wilson Wood as Reporter
 Jorie Wyler as Theresa Jump

Production
In February 1941, MGM bought the remake rights to Cimarron from RKO for $100,000. In 1947, MGM announced an operetta version starring Kathryn Grayson and produced by Arthur Freed, but this did not happen. In February 1958, MGM announced its plans to produce Cimarron as the studio's second film using the MGM Camera 65 process following Raintree Country (1957). One month later, Elizabeth Taylor and Rock Hudson were considered to star in the film. Ultimately, Glenn Ford, who previously starred in the Westerns such as 3:10 to Yuma (1957) and The Sheepman (1958), was attached to star.

In October 1959, Arnold Schulman was signed to write the screenplay. For his script, Schulman introduced several characters, including those of journalist Sam Pegler (Robert Keith) and Wes Jennings (Vic Morrow), while removing the Cravats' daughter, Donna and a boy named Isaiah. King Vidor declined an invitation to direct. Anthony Mann was eventually named as director. Known primarily for the critically acclaimed hits The Glenn Miller Story (1954) and Men in War (1957), Mann had previously directed eight Westerns. However, disagreements with producer Edmund Grainger caused Mann to leave the project halfway through filming. Mann had wanted to film entirely on location, but Grainger wanted a majority of scenes instead to be filmed in studio. Director Charles Walters finished the film but received no screen credit.

The climactic scene portraying the Oklahoma Land Rush was shot in Arizona and featured over 1,000 extras, 700 horses and 500 wagons and buggies.

Anne Baxter, who played Dixie Lee, revealed in her autobiography Intermission that Ford and Maria Schell developed an offscreen romance: "During shooting, they'd scrambled together like eggs. I understood she'd even begun divorce proceedings in Germany. It was obviously premature of her." However, by the end of filming, "... he scarcely glanced or spoke in her direction, and she looked as if she were in shock."

Reception

Box office
According to MGM records, Cimarron earned $2,325,000 in the U.S. and Canada and $2,500,000 overseas, resulting in an overall loss of $3,618,000.

Critical reaction
Harrison's Reports wrote: "The background music is undistinguished. There's enough marquee strength, action, romance, and the 'land rush' scene at the beginning is worth the price of a soft ticket. Color photography is outstanding." Thomas M. Pryor, reviewing for Variety, praised Schell and Ford's performances, and wrote "Although Cimarron is not without flaws—thoughtful examination reveals a pretentiousness of social significance more than valid exposition—the script plays well."

Bosley Crowther of The New York Times felt the film's opening "makes for a dynamic and illustrative sequence on the screen. But once the land rush is over in this almost two-and-one-half-hour-long film—and we have to tell you it is assembled and completed within the first half-hour—the remaining dramatization of Miss Ferber's bursting 'Cimarron' simmers down to a stereotyped and sentimental cinema saga of the taming of the frontier." A review in Time magazine criticized the film's length, writing Cimarron "might more suitably have been called Cimarron-and-on-and-on-and-on. It lasts 2 hours and 27 minutes, and for at least half of that time most spectators will probably be Oklacomatose."

Awards and nominations
In 1961, the film was nominated for Best Art Direction (George W. Davis, Addison Hehr, Henry Grace, Hugh Hunt and Otto Siegel) and Best Sound (Franklin Milton).

Glenn Ford's performance earned a nomination for a Laurel Award for Top Action Performance, though he did not win.

See also
 List of American films of 1960

References

Footnotes

Citations

Bibliography

External links
 
 
 
 

1960 films
1960s English-language films
1960 Western (genre) films
American Western (genre) epic films
Films scored by Franz Waxman
Films based on Western (genre) novels
Films directed by Anthony Mann
Films based on American novels
Films set in Oklahoma
Metro-Goldwyn-Mayer films
Films based on works by Edna Ferber
1960s American films